The Hughes 25 is a Canadian trailerable sailboat that was designed by Howard Hughes as a cruiser and first built in 1968.

The Hughes 25 is most likely a development of William Shaw's Nutmeg 24 design.

Production
The Hughes 25 was built by Hughes Boat Works in Canada, starting in 1968 and proved commercially successful. It is now out of production.

Design

Hughes Boat Works acquired the tooling and moulds for the Nutmeg 24 from Tanzer Industries and used it to develop the Hughes 24, although it only sold in small numbers. The Hughes 25 is thought to be derived from the same design, with the addition of a fin keel, spade-type rudder and a reverse transom, but retaining Shaw's basic hull shape.

The Hughes 25 is a recreational keelboat, built predominantly of fibreglass, with wood trim. It has a masthead sloop rig, a spooned raked stem, a reverse transom, an internally mounted spade-type rudder controlled by a tiller and a fixed fin keel. It displaces  and carries  of ballast.

The design has sleeping accommodation for five people, in one of two cabin interior plans. Layout A has a double "V"-berth in the bow cabin, two straight settees in the main cabin and an aft quarter berth on the starboard side, under the cockpit. The galley is located on the port side abeam the companionway ladder and is equipped with a sink. The head is a potable type, located under the bow "V"-berth. Layout B locates the galley forward, in place of the port settee and adds an extra quarter berth on the port side. A forward hatch provides cabin ventilation.

For sailing downwind the design may be equipped with a symmetrical or asymmetrical spinnaker.

See also
List of sailing boat types

References

Keelboats
1960s sailboat type designs
Sailing yachts
Trailer sailers
Sailboat type designs by Howard Hughes
Sailboat types built by Hughes Boat Works